Jonathan Pereira Rodríguez (born 12 May 1987), sometimes known simply as Jonathan, is a Spanish professional footballer. A forward, his main asset is his incredible speed.

Club career
Pereira was born in Vigo, Pontevedra. After having completed his footballing education at Villarreal CF, he made his first-team – and La Liga – debut against Levante UD on 21 October 2006: he entered the pitch with 25 minutes to go and scored after only two minutes on the field, going on to total four league appearances throughout the season.

For 2007–08, Pereira was loaned to Segunda División club Racing de Ferrol, and finished the season at 11 goals, although the Galician team would be relegated. He returned to Villarreal in July 2008 and had his contract extended until 2013, but was immediately loaned for the campaign to fellow league side Racing de Santander. On 13 September, he scored a 77th-minute equaliser at the Camp Nou in a 1–1 tie against FC Barcelona; mainly used from the bench he had a solid overall campaign, with eight goals in 41 matches (adding two in five in the season's UEFA Cup).

Pereira returned to Villarreal subsequently but, despite netting seven goals in a pre-season friendly, he was very rarely used during the first months of 2009–10. In mid-January 2010, he left the club and signed with second level's Real Betis on a five-year deal, scoring in his debut on the 31st, the game's only at Andalusia neighbours Córdoba CF.

On 10 December 2012, Pereira returned to the Yellow Submarine, contributing with four goals in 30 matches in his second season in his second spell to help the team finish in sixth position straight out of division two and qualify to the UEFA Europa League. On 5 August 2014 he moved to Rayo Vallecano for the season but, in the next transfer window, joined Real Valladolid also on loan.

After being released by Villarreal, Pereira went on to represent, always in the second tier, CD Lugo, Real Oviedo and AD Alcorcón. On 28 July 2019, he signed a two-contract with Gimnàstic de Tarragona, recently relegated to the Segunda División B.

Pereira terminated his contract with Nàstic on 1 February 2021, after failing to feature a single minute for the club in 2020–21.

Club statistics

Honours
Betis
Segunda División: 2010–11

References

External links

1987 births
Living people
Spanish footballers
Footballers from Vigo
Association football forwards
La Liga players
Segunda División players
Tercera División players
Villarreal CF B players
Villarreal CF players
Racing de Ferrol footballers
Racing de Santander players
Real Betis players
Rayo Vallecano players
Real Valladolid players
CD Lugo players
Real Oviedo players
AD Alcorcón footballers
Gimnàstic de Tarragona footballers
Spain youth international footballers
Spain under-21 international footballers